Paya Pekan Tutong is a village in Tutong District, Brunei, within the mukim of Pekan Tutong. The postcode for Paya Pekan Tutong is TA3941.

References 

Paya Pekan Tutong